The 1918–19 Georgetown Hoyas men's basketball team represented Georgetown University during the 1918–19 NCAA college basketball season. John O'Reilly coached the team in his fifth season as head coach. Georgetown was an independent and played its home games at Ryan Gymnasium on the Georgetown campus in Washington, D.C. Amid the raging Spanish influenza pandemic, the Hoyas met only local teams and played a shortened season, which they finished with a record of 9-1.

Season recap

On-campus Ryan Gymnasium, where the Hoyas had played their home games since the 1914-15 season, had no seating, accommodating fans on a standing-room only-basis on an indoor track above the court. This precluded the accommodation of significant crowds, providing the self-sustaining Basketball Association with little revenue with which to fund the teams travel expenses, and Georgetown averaged no more than three road games a year from this season through the 1926-27 season in order to keep travel to a minimum. The 1918-19 teams only road trip outside of Washington was to Annapolis, Maryland, to play a game at  Navy.

The 1918–1919 season took place in between a second and third wave of the 1918–1919 influenza pandemic, the so-called "Spanish flu." In response to the second wave, which spread during September 1918, the District of Columbia government shut down most public activities for a month during September and October, and all team sports at Georgetown went into hiatus during that month. After a shortened football season in 1918, Georgetown turned its attention to basketball, but the customary early December start of the basketball season was delayed, and Georgetown basketball did not begin play until January 1919. To avoid playing during a possible third wave of the pandemic in the spring of 1919 — which, in fact, did occur — Georgetown's schedule was limited to 10 games, which the team completed in only 36 days, playing its final game on February 15, 1919. No Georgetown students died of influenza during the pandemic, but two former Georgetown basketball players — John Martin, a forward on the 1912–1913 team, and Alexander "Pat" Finnegan, a guard on the 1917–1918 team — died of it while serving in the U.S. armed forces during World War I, Finnegan shortly after receiving his United States Army commission.

The Hoyas home winning streak at Ryan Gymnasium reached 17 games at the end of this season, dating back to a victory against Bucknell on the last day of the 1916-17 season; it would reach 52 before finally coming to an end during the 1923-24 season. Georgetown also defeated crosstown rival George Washington twice this season, giving the Hoyas a 10-game winning streak against George Washington – eight of the wins at Ryan Gymnasium – dating back to 1915.

Forward and team captain Fred Fees, a student at Georgetown University Law School, was in his third season with the Hoyas. A free-throw shooting specialist in an era when the rules of college basketball allowed teams to choose which player shot its free throws, Fees had exploited his free-throw prowess to establish himself as one of the top scorers in college basketball in the United States in each of his seasons with the Hoyas. This season he played in all 10 games and scored 163 points, averaging 16.3 points per game.

Freshman forward Jack Flavin joined the team this season. He played in only six games but scored 54 points, an average of 9.0 points per game. He would become a starter the next season on his way to becoming one of the great Georgetown players of the era.

Freshman guard Andrew "Andy" Zazzali also joined the team. He played in all 10 games and averaged 6.2 points per game, and with 62 points was second only to Fees in scoring for the season.

One of the teams scheduled games was cancelled, and its only loss was at Navy in the third game of the year. It won the last seven games of the season to finish with a 9-1 record. Because of the shortened season, varsity players were granted an additional year of college eligibility, allowing Georgetown to return all five starters from the 1918–1919 team for the 1919–1920 season. The 1918–1919 team′s .900 winning percentage was the best in Georgetown men's basketball history at the time, but the Hoyas would exceed it the following year.

Roster

Sources

Georgetown players did not wear numbers on their jerseys this season. The first numbered jerseys in Georgetown mens basketball history would not appear until the 1933-34 season.

Sophomore forward Bill Dudack later served as the Hoyas′ head coach during the 1929-30 season.

1918–19 schedule and results
Sources

Notes

It was common practice at this time for colleges and universities to include non-collegiate opponents in their schedules, with the games recognized as part of their official record for the season, so the two games against a United States Army team from Camp A. A. Humphreys, Virginia, counted as part of Georgetowns won-loss record for 1918-19. It was not until 1952, after the completion of the 1951-52 season, that the National Collegiate Athletic Association (NCAA) ruled that colleges and universities could no longer count games played against non-collegiate opponents in their annual won-loss records.

|-
!colspan=9 style="background:#002147; color:#8D817B;"| Regular Season

Notes

References

Georgetown Hoyas men's basketball seasons
Georgetown
Georgetown Hoyas men's basketball team
Georgetown Hoyas men's basketball team